The 1934–35 League of Ireland was the fourteenth season of the League of Ireland. Bohemians were the defending champions.

Dolphin won their first title.

Overview

Cork Bohemians and Shelbourne were not re-elected to the League, while Waterford and Sligo Rovers were elected in their place. Waterford were re-elected after a two-year absence, while Sligo Rovers became the first team from Connacht to compete in the League.

Teams

Table

Results

Top goalscorers

Source:

See also 

 1934–35 FAI Cup

References

Ireland
Lea
League of Ireland seasons